Rameswaram–Tirupati Express connects Holy Island Rameswaram in Tamil Nadu  with Holy City Tirupati in Andhra Pradesh. This train is also called as Meenakshi Express as it travels via Temple City Madurai. The train goes via Madurai, Tiruchirappalli, Thanjavur, Kumbakonam, Viluppuram, Tiruvannamalai, Vellore, Katpadi. It recently runs with refurbished Utkrist coaches.

Traction
It runs 3 day in a week from Tirupati. It starts on Sunday, Tuesday, Friday and from Rameswaram it starts from Monday, Thursday, Saturday.

Service
16779 / 16780 runs at average speed of 56 km/hr and covers 828 km. It connects some major stations like Madurai, Tiruchirappalli, Kumbakonam, Tiruvannamalai, Vellore

Rake sharing
This train shares rakes with 22621/22622 Rameswaram–Kanniyakumari Superfast Express

Coach composition 
The train has standard ICF rakes with maximum speed of 110 kmph.

 3 AC III Tier
 11 Sleeper coaches
 6 General
 2 Second-class luggage/parcel van

SLR GS GS GS B3 B2 B1 S11 S10 S9 S8 S7 S6 S5 S4 S3 S2 S1 GS GS GS SLR

Express trains in India